Osten (Macedonian Cyrillic: Остен) was a weekly magazine in the Socialist Republic of Macedonia later Macedonia. In 2010, Osten was published as part of the daily newspaper Vreme. The magazine has received financial aid from the government of Macedonia.

References

External links
2009 Catalog

1945 establishments in Yugoslavia
Humor magazines
Magazines established in 1945
Magazines published in North Macedonia
Magazines published in Yugoslavia
Weekly magazines
Mass media in Skopje
Macedonian-language magazines
Newspaper supplements